The 2020 EuroNASCAR Esports Series is the inaugural season of the EuroNASCAR Esports Series. The series was launched after the opening rounds of the 2020 NASCAR Whelen Euro Series were postponed due to the COVID-19 pandemic. This esports racing championship uses the iRacing platform with drivers racing NASCAR Cup Series machinery.

Format
The series uses a heat racing system. After a 2-lap qualifying session, two 10-minute Heat Races will each send the top 15 drivers to the Main Event. Those left out from the Heat Races will have one last opportunity to find their way to the final through the 10-min Last Chance Qualifier, which will award six transfer positions. The Main Event Race will be 30 minutes long and award ENES championship points using the NWES points system.

Entry list

Calendar and results

See also
 2020 NASCAR Cup Series
 2020 NASCAR Xfinity Series
 2020 NASCAR Gander RV & Outdoors Truck Series
 2020 ARCA Menards Series
 2020 ARCA Menards Series East
 2020 ARCA Menards Series West
 2020 NASCAR Whelen Modified Tour
 2020 NASCAR Pinty's Series
 2020 NASCAR Whelen Euro Series
 eNASCAR iRacing Pro Invitational Series

References

EuroNASCAR
Euronascar Esports